Kobiela may refer to:
Kobiela, Opole Voivodeship (south-west Poland)
Kobiela, Świętokrzyskie Voivodeship (south-central Poland)
Kobiela, Warmian-Masurian Voivodeship (north Poland)
Kobiela (surname)

See also